Kumalyr (Kumalır) is a rural locality (a selo) in Shebalinsky District, the Altai Republic, Russia. The population was 162 as of 2016. There are 3 streets.

Geography 
Kumalyr is located 11 km south of Shebalino (the district's administrative centre) by road. Shebalino is the nearest rural locality.

References 

Rural localities in Shebalinsky District